Emamiyeh (also Romanized as Emāmīyeh) is a village in Qareh Toghan Rural District, in the Central District of Neka County, Mazandaran Province, Iran. At the 2006 census, its population was 158, in 39 families.

References 

Populated places in Neka County